Golovnin (Tomari-yama) is a caldera located in the southern part of Kunashir Island, Kuril Islands, Russia. It is the southernmost volcano of the Kuril Islands.

It is named after Russian explorer Vasily Golovnin.

See also
 List of volcanoes in Russia

References 
 

Kunashir Island
Calderas of Russia
Calderas of Japan
Active volcanoes
Volcanoes of the Kuril Islands
Pleistocene calderas
Holocene calderas